Richard Iredale (born 9 February 1957) is a British former swimmer. He competed in the men's 100 metre butterfly at the 1976 Summer Olympics.

References

1957 births
Living people
British male swimmers
Olympic swimmers of Great Britain
Swimmers at the 1976 Summer Olympics
Place of birth missing (living people)